was a Japanese statesman, courtier and politician during the Heian period.

Career at court
He was a minister during the reign of Emperor Montoku.

 857 (Ten'an 1, 2nd month): Yoshisuke was made udaijin.

Yoshisuke helped to write the Shoku Nihon Kōki.

Genealogy
This member of the Fujiwara clan was the son of Fujiwara no Fuyutsugu.  Yoshisuke's brothers were Fujiwara no Yoshifusa, Fujiwara no Nagayoshi and Fujiwara no Yoshikado.

He was father to Fujiwara no Tagakishi and Fujiwara no Tamishi.

Notes

References
 Brinkley, Frank and Dairoku Kikuchi. (1915). A History of the Japanese People from the Earliest Times to the End of the Meiji Era. New York: Encyclopædia Britannica. OCLC 413099
 Nussbaum, Louis-Frédéric and Käthe Roth. (2005).  Japan encyclopedia. Cambridge: Harvard University Press. ;  OCLC 58053128
 Titsingh, Isaac. (1834).  Annales des empereurs du Japon (Nihon Odai Ichiran).  Paris: Royal Asiatic Society, Oriental Translation Fund of Great Britain and Ireland. OCLC 5850691

813 births
867 deaths
Fujiwara clan
People of Heian-period Japan